This is a list of airports in Malaysia, sorted by location.

Airports 

In total, Malaysia has 63 airports (39 in East Malaysia and 24 in Peninsular Malaysia). Among them, 38 airports have scheduled passenger service on commercial airlines (shown in bold). Other than that, Malaysia has 8 international airports.

Defunct

See also 

 Transport in Malaysia
 List of the busiest airports in Malaysia
 Malaysia Airports
 Royal Malaysian Air Force#Airbases
 List of airports by ICAO code: W#WM - Peninsular Malaysia (Peninsular Malaysia)
 List of airports by ICAO code: W#WB - Brunei and East Malaysia (East Malaysia)
 Wikipedia:WikiProject Aviation/Airline destination lists: Asia#Malaysia

References

 
Malaysia
Airports in Malaysia
Airports
Malaysia